The 2000–01 Sevilla Fútbol Club season was the club's 111th season in existence and the club's first season back in the second division of Spanish football. In addition to the domestic league, Sevilla participated in this season's edition of the Copa del Rey.

Transfers

In

Out

Pre-season and friendlies

Competitions

Overview

Segunda División

League table

Results summary

Results by round

Matches

Copa del Rey

Notes

References

External links

Sevilla FC seasons
Sevilla FC